Kibweni is a village on the Tanzanian island of Unguja, part of Zanzibar in the continent of Africa. It is located on the west coast, five kilometres to the north of the capital, Zanzibar City, on the road to Bububu and Chuini.

References
Finke, J. (2006) The Rough Guide to Zanzibar (2nd edition). New York: Rough Guides.

Villages in Zanzibar